Daniel Comstock may refer to:

 Daniel Frost Comstock (1883–1970), American physicist and engineer
 Daniel Webster Comstock (1840–1917), U.S. Representative from Indiana

See also
 Comstock (surname)